Clear and present danger was a doctrine adopted by the US Supreme Court to determine when limits can be placed on First Amendment freedoms.

Clear and present danger may also refer to:

 Clear and Present Danger, a 1989 novel by Tom Clancy
 Clear and Present Danger (film), a 1994 film adaptation
 "Clear and Present Danger", a 2014 episode of the ABC TV series Castle
 "A Clear and Present Danger", a 2009 episode of the NBC TV series Heroes